Yuri Khanon is a pen name of Yuri Feliksovich Soloviev-Savoyarov, a Russian composer. Prior to 1993, he wrote under a pen name Yuri Khanin, but later transformed it into Yuri Khanon, spelling it in a pre-1918 Russian style as ХанонЪ. Khanon was born on June 16, 1965 in Leningrad. In 1988, he became a laureate of  the European Film Awards ("Felix" Award, the European analog of the Oscar Award), and in 1989, he won "Nika", a Russian cinematographic award. Due to his numerous concerts throughout Russia, as well as to TV and cinema appearances, Khanon reached the peak of his popularity in 1988–1992, but in 1993, decided to stop performing in public.

Biography

In 1988, in spite of an opposition of his old-fashioned professors, Yuri Khanon managed to graduate from the Leningrad Conservatory, specializing in composition. He named Erik Satie and Alexander Skryabin as his teachers and predecessors, worshipping their ideology and originality.

Yuri Khanon is not  just a composer; he is also a writer, a philosopher, a painter, a studio pianist, and a botanist-selectionist. Khanon is author of libretto and texts of almost all his works. His grandfather was Mikhail Savoyarov, a comic actor and composer, who was very famous in St.Petersburg (Petrograd) on the eve of  the Revolution of 1917.

Khanon became famous in 1988–1991. During this period he composed soundtracks to three films, gave numerous concerts, had several appearances on TV and published a series of articles and interviews. Many of his performances yielded public scandals, especially his concerts "Music of Dogs" (Moscow, December 1988) and "Dried Embryos", where he performed with Erik Satie (Leningrad, May 1991). In 1992 produced CD "Olympia" (England), symphonic works of Khanon (as a Yuri Khanin): "Five smallest orgasms", "A Certain Concert for piano and orchestra" and "Middle Symphony". 
"Five Smallest orgasms, oc.29 (1986) were written as a direct response to Scriabin’s Poem of Ecstasy. A "Certain Concerto" for piano & orchestra, oc.31 (1987) was written in the genre of "false concerto", concerto/deception, where the listener is constantly deceived, having his/her expectations crowned with emptiness. The theme of deception is one of the main features of Khanin’s creations. "Middle Symphony", oc.40 (1990), with a text by the composer, is a large, quite extraordinary work with a rather unnatural and affected structure. It ends with a canon in which the three singers sing the same text backwards for 81 bars. The text is very abstruse, in fact almost absurd; it becomes necessary to overturn one’s impression of the whole symphony just listened to… Does this discussion exhaust the subject of this disc? I don’t know – I doubt it".

After 1992 Khanon ceased his public and TV appearances, as well as interviews and concerts, and stopped publishing his music works. Instead he decided, in his own words, "...to work and live in his own company ". Khanon never participated in any professional organizations and is notable for his independent ideas and reclusive way of  life. 
"... Beyond all doubts, Yuri Khanon came into the history of music as "the most closed and enigmatic composer". He was 23 when he won fame in Europe and made a sensation in Russia, but, after only three years of performing in public he stopped any public appearances contrary to the standards of a composer’s career. Metaphorically speaking, he  stormed out and started a life of a recluse, thus having declared: "I’m done! You’d better think I exist no more!" And we, his contemporaries, have nothing  to respond"... 
— prof. V.Tikhonov, "White Mask Empire" (Khangёre Simnun, Seoul, 2003).

Among Khanon's works for theatre the most famous is "The Middle Duo"  ballet (the first part of his "Middle Symphony"), put on the stage in Mariinsky theatre in 1998  and short-listed for the Golden Mask Theatre Award in 2000, then put on the stage in Bolshoy Theatre and in New York City Ballet theatre in 2006. As a concert number "The Middle Duo" is performed around the world by almost all soloists of Russian ballet, though for 10 years Khanon's music has been used without his permission.

From the very beginning of his career Khanon deliberately evaded calling himself a composer, a writer, or an artist.  Creative work is the least important for him, because, according to his ideas, there's more than enough composers and artists in our world. "It’s impossible to walk down the street without bumping into just another writer or composer," – Khanon ironically wrote in one of his articles in 1993. He viewed his main mission not in creating works of art, but in promotion of certain concepts put to life by the means of art.

"...Yuri Khanon is a doctrinaire and an adherent of canons. This means he is not a composer. For Khanon the art of composing music is just a way of expressing his dogmas. Other ways he uses are literature and performance. Khanon plays Erik Satie’s and Alexander Skryabin’s piano works for he sees them as his teachers, and he calls other composers "just some composers". He himself writes a lot of music which can be either "middle" or "extreme". <…> Khanon is a unique personality of our (and probably, some other) times, a strange and interesting person…"
— ( Viktor Ekimovsky, "Auto-mono-graphy")

Works
Yuri Khanon works almost in all sphere of academic music.  

Ballets
 "One step forward – two steps backward" (oc.24, 1986, based on a famous article by Vladimir Lenin).
 "L’Os de chagrin" (oc.37, 1989, "The Shagreen Bone", based on Balzac's novel "La Peau de chagrin").
 "The Nutcrackle" (oc.43, 1990, based on Pyotr Tchaykovskii's ballet "The Nutcracker").
 "Sigelle" (oc.55, 1993, based on Adame's ballet "Giselle").
Operas
 "L’Os de chagrin" (oc.38, 1990, The Shagreen Bone opera-interlude from the ballet L’Os de chagrin).
 "Dull Life" (oc.54, 1993, dull opera, libretto of Yuri Khanon).
 "The Force of Destiny" (oc.59, 1995, opera omonima based on opera La forza del destino of Giuseppe Verdi).
 "The Norm" (oc.65, 1997, opera incognita, based on opera "Norma" of Vincenzo Bellini).
 "What Zarathustra Said Indeed" (oc.68, 1998, clerical operette, based on "Thus Spoke Zarathustra" of Friedrich Nietzsche).
Pieces for Orchestra
 "The Symphony of Dogs" (oc.35, 1989).
 "The Middle Symphony" (oc.40, 1990).
 "Leafing People Through" (a 5 hours long orchestral fresco oc.54, 1992).
 "Three Extreme Symphonies" (oc.60, 1996).
 "The Laughing Symphony" (oc.70, 1999).

 Pseudo-religious works
 "Missa sterilis" for five persons, (oc.61, 1996)
 "The Inner Requiem", albigenian «Requiem internam» (oc.71, 1999)
 the "Agonia Dei" mystery (oc.72, 2000)
 Opuses for piano
 "The average tempered clavier" (ос.39, 1990)
 "Satisfactory pieces" for acoustic piano (ос.56, 1994, «Pieces Saties-faisantes»)
 "24 exercises on account of Weakness" (ос.62, 1996, for those wishing to go deeper)
 "50 etudes for fallen piano" (ос.64, 1997, for a fallen piano)
 "Ossified preludes" for piano (ос.67, 1998, four-hour time for piano)... and many other pieces of symphonic, chamber, and piano music.
«...Although Khanon calls Satie and Skryabin his teachers, it is not the music of these composers that attracts him but their tendency to link – some would say subordinate – their music to an idea. According to Khanon, a composer is an ideologist with regard to his musical material. Elements of play (both semantic and phonetic), paradox, the absurd and nonsense (word inversion and invention, pseudo-quotation and limerick) all lend Khanon's aesthetic a desire to outrage the listener…»
— ( Liudmila Kovnatskaya, Grove’s Dictionary of Music & Musicians)

Since 2006, Yuri Khanon switched to a special «reverse method» of creativity, when «one score is written forward, and the other is simultaneously back to its complete destruction». This is his Hermetic answer:
"This world is a criminal, it deserves nothing but ash"...

Works for the cinema

Yuri Khanon worked for the cinema only for a short period between 1988 and 1991. He composed his first soundtrack (for "Days of Eclipse" by Alexander Sokurov) already as a Conservatory student.
"...Yuri Khanin, a young composer, this year a graduate of the Leningrad Conservatory managed to do everything about the orchestration, arrangement and choice of instruments in a very precise way. It was done with an ideal exactitude. Never before had I worked with composers so much, and I was really struck by his understanding. <…> I think that sound, no less than the image, should produce not only emotional impact, but is to have an altogether independent semantic meaning. The spirituality of the film as if finds its expression through the sound. And spirituality would not emerge by itself. If you might sometimes fail to keep alive the memory of a visual image in your mind and in your heart the soul would never forget sounds…" 
— ( Alexander Sokurov, from press-conference on September 26, 1988)
The film "Days of Eclipse" won the "Euro-Oscar" ("Felix Award") of the European Film Academy in November 1988 in West Berlin in the "Best Music" special nomination. In spite of his great success, after 1991 Yuri Khanon never returned to writing music for the cinema.

Filmography :
1988 — "Days of Eclipse" (composer) 
1989 — "Save and Preserve" (composer), (the film is based on "Madame Bovary" by Gustave Flaubert).
1990 — "The Petty Demon" (composer), (the film is based on "The Petty Demon" – a novel by Fyodor Sologub).
1992 — "L’os de chagrin" ("Shagreen Bone", Chagrenevaia Kost (ru), 38 min.) (a pseudodocumental opera-film, where Khanon acted as a composer, a script writer – in collaboration with Igor Bezrukov – and also performed the leading part).

Literary works

Since 1983, Khanon writes fiction and non-fiction as an essayist and novelist. His most famous work is 700 pages long memoir novel "Skryabin As a Face" (1995) based on the 20 years long Khanon's close acquaintance with the great Russian composer Alexander Skryabin. Part of the edition is a true polygraphic artwork produced with a natural leather binding, hand-made according to a 19th-century technique.  The novel is written as a stylization of literary and spoken language of the beginning of the 20th century. 
"...For the first time in the history of music the narrator is not a biographer or a critic, not even a writer or a philosopher, but Alexander Skryabin’s counterpart and colleague and in a way a person of no less originality and uniqueness. This must explain why the memoir is absolutely free of banalities and literary cliché. Even ten years after his death, Skryabin is still a bosom friend of the author, a neighbour, an internal brother-in-arms…"
         — Annotation from the "Faces of Russia" ("Liki Rossii") Publishing house
In the year 2010, Center of Average Music and the publishing house "Faces of Russia" released another thick work of music history: "Erik Satie, Yuri Khanon. Antedate memories". The book has a volume of 700 pages and it is not accidentally written in a provocative and free form. It includes all literary works, critical essays, notes and even notebooks of Erik Satie, as well as almost all the letters, more than sixty drawings and all his entire life, from birth to death. This is the first book of Sati on Sati in Russian.

Liens
 Canonic Yuri Khanon — official website ru
 Yuri Khanon par prof. Tikhonov
 Yuri Khanon «Newspaper Menu» (en) (translation: prof.Pak Noja)
 Yuri Khanon «On the Musical Influence of the Dogs» (en) (translation: prof.Pak Noja)
 Mirage of the Opera (ru)
 «Middle Duet» (video) music of Yuri Khanon
 Yuri Khanon: «Middle Symphony»
 Yuri Khanon: «Five Smallest orgasms»
 Encyclopedie of Russian cinema (ru)
 Yuri Khanon: texts on the site KhanógrapH (ru)

Sources
This article is an abridged version of the article on Khanon ( ru : Юрий Ханон ) in the Russian Wikipedia

References

1965 births
20th-century classical composers
21st-century classical composers
Russian ballet composers
European Film Award for Best Composer winners
Living people
Russian opera composers
Male opera composers
Writers from Saint Petersburg
Russian male classical composers
Russian classical pianists
Male classical pianists
Russian male essayists
Russian film score composers
Male film score composers
Russian male novelists
Russian male short story writers
Musicians from Saint Petersburg
Saint Petersburg Conservatory alumni
21st-century classical pianists
20th-century Russian male musicians
21st-century Russian male musicians